Muhammad Rifky Alhabsyi (born May 9, 1984) is an Indonesian former footballer. He retired from football in 2015.

Personal life
He was also a famous actor in Indonesia before he returned to play football in 2008.

References

1984 births
Association football forwards
Living people
Indonesian footballers
Liga 1 (Indonesia) players
Persiba Balikpapan players
Sriwijaya F.C. players
Indonesian Premier Division players
Persikabo Bogor players
PSIM Yogyakarta players
21st-century Indonesian male actors
Sportspeople from Surabaya